Two ships of the Royal Navy have been named HMS Rhyl, after the town of Rhyl in Wales: 

  was a  launched in 1940 and sold in 1948.
  was a  launched in 1959 and expended as a target in 1985.

Royal Navy ship names